A state decoration is an object, such as a medal or the insignia of an order, that is awarded by a sovereign state to honor the recipient.

The term includes civil awards and decorations, as well as military awards and decorations.

See also 
 List of civil awards and decorations
 List of military decorations
 State order

Orders, decorations, and medals
Public administration